The AN/TPY-4, formerly known as the TPY-X, is a ground-based, active electronically scanned array, L-band, multi-function long-range 3D radar for air defense surveillance, built by Lockheed Martin.

IT was selected by the US Air Force to replace the FPS-75 radar.

Category

See also
 AESA
 TPY-2

References

Radars of the United States Air Force
Lockheed Martin